The Gambler is a 1997 drama film directed by Károly Makk and starring Michael Gambon, Jodhi May and Polly Walker. It is set around the writing of the 1866 novel The Gambler by Fyodor Dostoyevsky.

The film was notable for its casting of Luise Rainer. The Oscar-winning actress had not made a film in fifty-four years prior to her appearance in this one.

Plot summary

Cast
 Michael Gambon ...  Fyodor Dostoyevsky
 Jodhi May ...  Anna Snitkina
 Polly Walker ...  Polina
 Dominic West ...  Alexei
 Luise Rainer ...  Grandmother
 Will Houston ...  Pasha
 Johan Leysen ...  De Grieux
 John Wood ...  The General
 Angeline Ball ...  Mlle. Blanche
 Marjon Brandsma ...  Mme. de Cominges
 Mark Lacey ...  Ivan
 Gijs Scholten van Aschat ...  Maikov
 Lucy Davis ...  Dunya
 András Fekete ...  Potapych
 Patrick Godfrey ...  Professor Olkhin
 Greet Groot ...  Ustinya
 Tom Jansen ...  Stellovsky
 Miklós Székely B. ...  Anna's Father
 Vera Venczel ...  Anna's Mother
 János Xantus ...  Karl
 Ed De Bruin ...  Croupier I
 Vittoria De Bruin ...  Middle Aged Woman
 Zoltán Gera ...  Creditor

References

External links
 
 
 

1997 films
1997 drama films
British drama films
Hungarian drama films
Dutch drama films
Biographical films about writers
English-language Dutch films
English-language Hungarian films
Films directed by Károly Makk
Films set in 1866
Films about gambling
Works about Fyodor Dostoyevsky
1990s British films